Touch of Class was a bay American-bred Thoroughbred mare who was on United States Equestrian Team at the 1984 Summer Olympics, winning the gold medal in the individual and team show jumping events. She was ridden by Joseph Fargis.

History

Pre-1984 Olympics
Touch of Class was foaled in on April 27, 1973, and was first registered as Stillaspill with the Jockey Club, having a brief racing career before being trained as a show-jumper.  In 1981, in her first year at the Grand Prix level, she won classes at several shows, and in 1982 she qualified with Fargis for the USET's team for the World Championships in Dublin.  When an injury took Fargis out of the saddle in 1982, Touch of Class was turned over to Conrad Homfeld, and the team won the Grand Prix at Southampton and came in 4th in the 1983 World Cup.  With Fargis back in the saddle, Touch of Class was part of Nation's Cup teams that won in Rome and Calgary in 1983, and in later in her career she was also on Nation's Cup teams that won in Aachen, Washington and New York.  In 1984, Touch of Class and Fargis won the Grand Prix of Tampa.

1984 Olympics
Through consistent performances in Olympic trial events in 1984, Touch of Class and Fargis were named to the USET Olympic Show Jumping team, nicknamed the "Dream Team".  Touch of Class posted the first double clear rounds in Olympic history, and cleared 90 out of 91 jumps, taking home two gold medals.  In the jump-off, Touch of Class and Fargis competed against her former rider, Conrad Homfeld, who took home silver.  She was the fourth horse in history to win two show-jumping gold medals, with the last being Hans Winkler's Halla in 1956.  Her performance allowed her to be named the first non-human USOC Female Equestrian Athlete of the Year.

Post-1984 Olympics
Touch of Class continued to compete successfully throughout the 1980s, and took the top place in the World Cup U.S. East Coast League standings in both 1984 and 1985.  She also had a successful breeding career.  Touch of Class was inducted into the Show Jumping Hall of Fame in 2000, and she died at River Circle Farm in Franklin, Tennessee on July 1, 2001.

Pedigree

See also
Equestrian at the Summer Olympics
List of historical horses

References

Thoroughbred family 3-i
Show jumping horses
Horses in the Olympics
1973 animal births
2001 animal deaths